David Burton may refer to:

 H. David Burton (born 1938), American leader in The Church of Jesus Christ of Latter-day Saints
 David Cecil Burton (1887–1971), cricketer and captain of Yorkshire CCC
 David Burton (cricketer, born 1985) (born 1985), English fast bowler
 David Burton (cricketer, born 1888) (1888–1948), first-class cricketer and cousin of Cecil (above)
 David Burton (botanist) (died 1792), botanist and surveyor in early colonial New South Wales
 David Burton (lawyer), professor at University of Maryland and partner of The Argus Group, see Americans For Fair Taxation
 David Burton (director) (1877–1963), American film director
 David H. Burton, American historian
 David Burton, a character in the video game Nemesis 3: The Eve of Destruction
 David "Pan The Gypsy" Burton, former rhythm guitarist and songwriter for the rock band Black Veil Brides

See also
 David Bruton (disambiguation)